Ştefan Sicaci (Stepan Vasilyevich Sikach, born 8 September 1988) is a Moldovan footballer who plays in Kazakhstan for Kaisar.

References

External links
 

1988 births
People from Tiraspol
Living people
Moldovan footballers
Moldova under-21 international footballers
Moldovan expatriate footballers
Association football goalkeepers
FC Sheriff Tiraspol players
FC Akhmat Grozny players
FC Volgar Astrakhan players
FC Salyut Belgorod players
FC Torpedo Moscow players
FC Kolkheti-1913 Poti players
FC Dinamo Tbilisi players
FC Samtredia players
FC Akzhayik players
Russian Premier League players
Erovnuli Liga players
Moldovan expatriate sportspeople in Georgia (country)
Expatriate footballers in Georgia (country)
Moldovan expatriate sportspeople in Kazakhstan
Expatriate footballers in Kazakhstan